Otobothrioidea Dollfus is part of the five superfamilies of Palm's system. Through evolution it is seen that the bothrial pits of Otobothrioidea and the bothrial grooves of the Lacistorhynchoidea Guiart are related (Haseli, & Malekpour Fard, Z., 2017).

Otobothriidae is a family of tapeworm created by Robert-Philippe Dollfus in 1942.

Genera
 Diplootobothrium
 Fossobothrium
 Otobothrium
 Poecilancistrium
 Pristiorhynchus
 Proemotobothrium
 Symbothriorhynchus

References
  Haseli, & Malekpour Fard, Z. (2017). A new genus and species of the trypanorhynch family Otobothriidae Dollfus, 1942 from the slender weasel shark Paragaleus randalli Compagno, Krupp & Carpenter (Hemigaleidae) in the Persian Gulf. Systematic Parasitology, 94(7), 765–775. https://doi.org/10.1007/s11230-017-9738-0 

Cestoda
Platyhelminthes families